General Hernandezor Hernández may refer to:

Rhett A. Hernandez (born 1953), U.S. Army lieutenant general
Adriano Hernández (1870–1925), Filipino revolutionary general
José Manuel Hernández (1853–1921), Venezuelan Army general
Joseph Marion Hernández (1788–1857), U.S. Army brigadier general